Niccolao Manucci (19 April 1638 – 1717) was a Venetian writer, a self-taught physician, and traveller, who wrote accounts of the Mughal Empire supposedly first-hand but with many details now considered doubtful. He also documented folk beliefs and customs of the period.

Biography 
Niccolò Manucci was born in Venice to Pasqualino Manucci and Rosa née Bellin. He joined an uncle in Corfu as a teenager and went aboard an English ship to India. In Delhi he lived with Jesuit priests learning Persian and some medical knowledge. He sent a ring back home with instructions that it should be sold for books on medicine to be sent back to him. After several dubious attempts as a medical practitioner with lucky cures effected for some influential patients he seems to have managed to work as a physician in the court of the Mughals. In 1653, he was recruited as a servant and guide by Henry Bard, 1st Viscount Bellomont, envoy from Charles II of England to Abbas II of Persia and Shah Jahan.

After Bard died at Hodal on 20 June 1656, Manucci moved to Surat and around 1656 he became an artillery man for Dara Shikoh. Following the death of Dara Shikoh he moved to Patna and later worked with Mirza Raja Jai Singh and in 1666 he tried to find work in Portuguese Bassein and Goa. He then returned to Mughal service in Lahore as a physician. He lost material in a shipwreck and then worked as a physician for Shah Alam in the Deccan. In 1682 he tried to act as an intermediary between the Portuguese and the Mughals and was made a member of the Order of Santiago by the Portuguese Viceroy Dom Francisco de Távora, Conde de Alvor but this ends in 1686 when he lost Mughal trust. He then moved to Hyderabad and then to Madras, marrying Elizabeth Hartley Clarke, widow of Portuguese interpreter Thomas Clarke. He lived in Madras with some work at Pondicherry where he obtained a house on the Rue Neuve de la Porte de Goudelour (Cuddalore). He maintained good relations with William Gyfford and Thomas Pitt.

Manucci remained in India for much of his life and is one of the few supposedly first hand European sources for Shah Jahan, Aurangzeb, Shivaji, Dara Shikoh, Shah Alam I, Jai Singh I and Kirat Singh. He had miniature paintings made of several of the Mughal rulers for his book.

Storia do Mogor 
Manucci is famous for his work "Storia do Mogor", an account of Mughal history and life. Manucci had first-hand knowledge of the Mughal court, and the book is considered to be the most detailed account of the Mughal court. It is an important account of the time of the later reign of Shah Jahan and of the reign of Aurangzeb. He also documented folk beliefs including witchcraft.

He wrote about his work: "I must add, that I have not relied on the knowledge of others; and I have spoken nothing which I have not seen or undergone..." .

Manucci spent almost his entire life in India. He would then send home the manuscript for "Storia do Mogor" which was lent to the French historian François Catrou in 1707. To Manucci's displeasure Catrou published his own embellished version as Histoire générale de l’empire du Mogul in 1715. The original then emerged in Berlin in 1915 and was written in three different languages. This version was translated and then published.

Works 
Some of Manucci's works, reprints, and translations include:

References

Sources

Further reading 
Eraly, Abraham. The Mughal World: Life in India's Last Golden Age. (London: Penguin Books. 2007).
Manucci, Niccolao, Storia do Mogor, Eng. trs. by W. Irvine, 4 vols. John Murray, London 1906.

Lane-Pool, Stanley. Aurangzeb and the decay of the Mughal empire (Delhi: S. Chand & Co.1964) 
Ali, Sadiq. A vindication of Aurangzeb in two parts (Calcutta: New Age Press. 1918)
Fasana-e-Saltanat-e-Mughlia. An Urdu Translation of Manucci diaries by Khan Bahadur Syed Muzaffar Ali Khan

External links 
 Storia do Mogor; or, Mogul India 1653-1708 Volume 1 Volume 2 (translated by William Irvine)
 Histoire générale de l'empire du Mogol, sur les mémoires portugais de m. Manouchi (1708, by Francois Catrou in French)

Italian travel writers
Italian male writers
1639 births
1717 deaths
17th-century travelers
Historians of India
Mughal Empire
18th-century Venetian historians
17th-century Venetian historians
17th-century travel writers
Emigrants from the Republic of Venice